Tarana Raja, (born 24 January 1977) also known as Tarana Raja Kapoor, is an Indian actress, dancer, television anchor, and radio host.

She is a co-host of a popular radio show in Mumbai, "Jaggu and Tarana", alongside Ashish Jagtiani (aka Jaggu). Due to the popularity of the radio program, a television show called COLORS CricQuiz was created.

Biography 
Tarana Raja was born on Monday, January 24th, 1977 in Delhi, India to parents Madhu Raja and Rabindranath Raja. She was raised in Mumbai, because her family had moved when she was at a young age. She attended University of Mumbai and Shiamak Davar's Institute of Performing Arts.

Filmography

Film

Television

Radio

Theatre

Dubbing roles

Animated films

References

External links
 

Living people
Actresses in Hindi cinema
Indian television actresses
Indian voice actresses
Actresses in Hindi television
Indian women television presenters
Indian television presenters
1977 births